Karen Michelle Barad (born 29 April 1956) is an American feminist theorist, known particularly for their theory of agential realism.

Biography 
They are currently Professor of Feminist Studies, Philosophy, and History of Consciousness at the University of California, Santa Cruz. They are the author of Meeting the Universe Halfway: Quantum Physics and the Entanglement of Matter and Meaning. Their research topics include feminist theory, physics, twentieth-century continental philosophy, epistemology, ontology, philosophy of physics, cultural studies of science, and feminist science studies.

Barad earned their doctorate in theoretical physics at Stony Brook University. Their dissertation presented computational methods for quantifying properties of quarks, and other fermions, and in the framework of lattice gauge theory.

Barad serves on the advisory board for the feminist academic journals Catalyst: Feminism, Theory, Technoscience and Signs: Journal of Women in Culture and Society.

Agential realism 
According to Barad's theory of agential realism, the universe comprises phenomena, which are "the ontological inseparability of intra-acting agencies". Intra-action, a neologism introduced by Barad, signals an important challenge to individualist metaphysics. For Barad, phenomena or objects do not precede their interaction, rather, "objects" emerge through particular intra-actions. Thus, apparatuses, which produce phenomena, are not assemblages of humans and nonhumans (as in actor-network theory). Rather, they are the condition of possibility of "humans" and "non-humans", not merely as ideational concepts, but in their materiality. Apparatuses are "material-discursive" in that they produce determinate meanings and material beings while simultaneously excluding the production of others. What it means to matter is therefore always material-discursive. Barad takes their inspiration from physicist Niels Bohr, one of the founders of quantum physics. Barad's agential realism is at once an epistemology (theory of knowing), an ontology (theory of being), and an ethics. For this, Barad introduces the neologism ontoepistemology. Because specific practices of mattering have ethical consequences, excluding other kinds of mattering, onto-epistemological practices are always in turn onto-ethico-epistemological.

Much of Barad's scholarly work has revolved around their concept of "agential realism," and their theories hold importance for many academic fields, including science studies, STS (Science, Technology, and Society), feminist technoscience, philosophy of science, feminist theory, and, of course, physics. In addition to Bohr, their work draws on the works of thinkers such as Michel Foucault, Judith Butler, Jacques Derrida, and Walter Benjamin, among others. 

Barad's original training was in theoretical particle physics and quantum field theory.  Their book, Meeting the Universe Halfway, (2007), includes a chapter that contains an original discovery in theoretical physics, which is largely unheard of in books that are usually categorized as "gender studies" or "cultural theory" books. In this book, Barad also argues that "agential realism," is useful to the analysis of literature, social inequalities, and many other things. This claim is based on the fact that Barad's agential realism is a way of understanding the politics, ethics, and agencies of any act of observation, and indeed any kind of knowledge practice.  According to Barad, the deeply connected way that each "thing" is entangled with everything else in materially specific ways means that all intra-actions reconfigure the entanglements. Barad's innovative and far-reaching formulation of intra-action, which challenges the usual notion of interaction which assumes a metaphysics of individualism, offers a new formulation of causality. There are not things that interact but rather through and within intra-actions there is a differentiating-entangling so that an agential cut is enacted that cuts things together-apart (one move) such that differences exist not as absolute separations but in their inseparability (i.e., "agential separability" as Barad calls it). Nothing is inherently separate from anything else, but separations are enacted within phenomena. This view of knowledge provides a framework for thinking about how culture and habits of thought can make some things visible and other things easier to ignore or to never see.  For this reason, according to Barad, agential realism is useful for feminist analysis and other forms of political and social thought, even if the connection to science is not apparent.

Barad's framework makes several other arguments, and some of them are part of larger trends in fields such as science studies and feminist technoscience (all can be found in their 2007 book, Meeting the Universe Halfway):

 They define agency as a relationship and not as something that one "has."
 The scientist and the social are always part of the apparatus, and one needs to take account of this in its inseparability in analyzing the system. This differs from the view that political critiques of science seek to undermine the credibility of science; instead, Barad argues that this kind of critique actually makes for better, more credible science.
 They argue that politics and ethical issues are always part of scientific work, and only are made to seem separate by specific historical circumstances that encourage people to fail to see those connections. One example they discuss is the ethics of developing nuclear weapons to argue this point, by claiming that the ethics and politics are part of how such weapons were developed and understood, and therefore part of science, and not merely of the "philosophy of science" or the "ethics of science."  This differs from the usual view that one can strive for a politics-free, bias-less science.
 Nevertheless, they argue against epistemological relativism, and offer an important alternative to the usual conception of objectivity.
 They also reject the idea that science is "only" a language game or set of fictions produced only by human constructions and concepts. Although the scientist is part of the "intra-action" of the experiment, humans (and their cultural constructs) do not have complete control over everything that happens. Barad expresses this point by saying, in "Getting Real," that although scientists shape knowledge about the universe, you can't ignore the way the universe "kicks back."

These points on science, agency, ethics, and knowledge reveal that Barad's work is similar to the projects of other science studies scholars such as Bruno Latour, Donna Haraway, Andrew Pickering, and Evelyn Fox Keller.

Selected bibliography

Books

Chapters in books

Journal articles 
  Abstract.
  Reprinted in various anthologies.

See also
Queer Theory
Feminist Studies
Michel Foucault
Niels Bohr
Epistemology
Donna Haraway
Technoscience

References

External links

 Karen Barad's UCSC web page
Joseph Rouse's discussion of agential realism, available on MUSE
 Review of Getting Real at the Nordic Journal of Feminist and Gender Research

1956 births
20th-century American philosophers
21st-century American philosophers
21st-century American physicists
American women philosophers
Continental philosophers
Epistemologists
Feminist philosophers
Living people
Ontologists
Philosophers of physics
Postmodern feminists
Theoretical physicists
University of California, Santa Cruz faculty
Philosophers from California
Stony Brook University alumni
Philosophers of science
20th-century American women
21st-century American women
Quantum mysticism advocates